Kakamega greenbul (Arizelocichla kakamegae), is a species of the bulbul family of passerine birds. It is found in east-central Africa. Its natural habitats are subtropical or tropical dry forests and subtropical or tropical moist montane forests.

Taxonomy and systematics
The Kakamega greenbul was originally described in the genus Xenocichla (a synonym for Bleda), then classified in Andropadus and, in 2010 re-classified to the new genus Arizelocichla. Also, some authorities consider the Kakamega greenbul to be a subspecies of Shelley's greenbul.

Subspecies
Two subspecies are recognized:
 A. k. kakamegae - (Sharpe, 1900): Originally described as a separate species in the genus Anthus and later in Pycnonotus. Found in eastern Democratic Republic of Congo, Uganda, western Kenya and north-western Tanzania
 A. k. kungwensis - Moreau, 1941: Found in western Tanzania

References

Arizelocichla
Birds described in 1900